Usimaka Walter Khumalo (born 2 September 1972) is a South African former professional footballer who played as a goalkeeper. He formerly played for Vaal Professionals, Mother City, Bloemfontein Celtic, AmaZulu, Black Leopards, Jomo Cosmos, and Free State Stars

Khumalo was primarily the backup keeper for Free State Stars, but has appeared for the first team.

References

1972 births
Living people
South African soccer players
Association football goalkeepers
Jomo Cosmos F.C. players
Free State Stars F.C. players
Bloemfontein Celtic F.C. players
Black Leopards F.C. players